Christoffer Selbekk (26 May 1939 – 11 January 2012) was a Norwegian businessperson and ski jumper.

As a ski jumper he finished fifth in the normal hill event at the 1966 World Championships. He was on the national team from 1963 to 1967. He has later held posts in the Norwegian Skiing Association and the Norwegian Golf Federation.

He completed a degree in economics at the University of Denver in 1962. He was the CEO of the company Tretorn Norge from 1974 to 1978 and of his own company, Chrisco Sport, from 1978. He resided in Eiksmarka. He died in January 2012.

References

1939 births
2012 deaths
Sportspeople from Bærum
Norwegian male ski jumpers
Norwegian businesspeople
University of Denver alumni
Norwegian expatriates in the United States
20th-century Norwegian people